Mostyn is a village, port and electoral ward in Flintshire, Wales. 

Mostyn may also refer to:

People

Given name
Mostyn Armstrong (died 1791), English publisher of maps
Moss Evans (1925–2002), British trade union leader
Mostyn Ffrench-Williams (1914–1963), British swimmer
Mostyn Hanger (1908–1980), Australian judge and administrator
Mostyn Thomas (1896–1984), Welsh singer

Surname
Mostyn (surname)

Titles
Baron Mostyn, County of Flint, a title in the Peerage of the United Kingdom
Edward Lloyd, 1st Baron Mostyn (1768–1854), British politician
Edward Lloyd-Mostyn, 2nd Baron Mostyn (1795–1884), British peer and politician
Gareth Williams, Baron Williams of Mostyn (1941–2003), British politician
Mostyn baronets, two lines of Welsh baronets 
Mostyn-Champneys baronets, County of Somerset, a former title in the Baronetage of Great Britain

Places
Mostyn (gallery), a contemporary art gallery in Llandudno, Wales
Mostyn (Llandudno electoral ward), a ward of Conwy Borough Council, North Wales
Mostyn Colliery, coal mine in Flintshire, North Wales
Mostyn Hall, stately house near Mostyn, Flintshire, Wales
Mostyn House School, a former school in Parkgate, Cheshire, England
Mostyn railway station, near Mostyn, Flintshire, Wales